Arthur E. Orloff (1908–1994) was an American screenwriter.

Selected filmography
 Alias Mr. Twilight (1946)
 Wild Country (1947)
 The Lone Wolf in London (1947)
 Cheyenne Takes Over (1947)
 Code of the Silver Sage (1950)
 Beauty on Parade (1950)
 Thunder in God's Country (1951)
 Buckaroo Sheriff of Texas (1951)
 Desperadoes' Outpost (1952)
 Red River Shore (1953)

References

Bibliography
 Pitts, Michael R. Western Movies: A Guide to 5,105 Feature Films. McFarland, 2012.

External links

1908 births
1994 deaths
People from Brooklyn
20th-century American screenwriters